Red is a 2002 Indian Tamil-language action film directed by Singampuli (under the name Ram Sathya) and produced by S S Chakravarthy. The film stars Ajith Kumar and Priya Gill, while Manivannan, Salim Ghouse and Raghuvaran played pivotal roles. The film's background score and soundtrack are composed by Deva.

The film released on 14 January 2002. It received mixed reviews from critics and had an average box office performance.

Synopsis 
Adhi is an orphan-gangster who is well known with his alias name RED, (Revolution, Education, and Development) at the Madurai district of Tamil Nadu who possesses a heart of gold, and when not bashing up mercenaries, he spends his time forcing schools to accept students without donations and taking care of orphans. Srini is his biggest enemy. RED falls for Gayathri, the daughter of his friend and confidante Narayanan, and helps her without her knowledge. She likes him but wants him to give up his life of violence. Meanwhile, reporter Manimegalai for Ananda Vikatan magazine begins to serialize red's life story under the name Aadhi, and it becomes quite the rage among readers and rest forms the plot.

Cast

Soundtrack

The soundtrack features six songs composed by Deva. The film's soundtrack became a success prior to release, with critics praising the songs particularly "Thai Madiyae". All lyrics written by Vairamuthu.

Production
NIC Arts, the producers of Ajith Kumar's previous films Vaali, Mugavaree and Citizen signed him to appear in a film titled Right directed by debutant Singampulia, an associate of Sundar C. The original plot point of Ajith's 1999 film Unnai Thedi was recommended by Singampuli, and Ajith had mentioned that if the film became a success he would feature in a future film to be directed by Singampuli. Priya Gill was signed as heroine while the film has music by Deva and cinematography by Rajasekar. The shoot of the film started at Annapoorna Studios where art director Sabu Cyril erected a part of Madurai town for the film. Other members announced to a part of the cast included Salim Ghouse, Rajan P Dev, Raghuvaran, Manivannan and Srividya. Filming took place in and around Chennai, Vishakhapatnam, Hyderabad and also around some outskirts of Madurai while songs were filmed overseas.

Release
The film was initially supposed to release in the Deepavali season of 2001 but was postponed to January 2002 to avoid competition with Kamal Haasan's Aalavandhan. The film did not succeed well at the box office.

Reception
Malathi Rangarajan of The Hindu opined that "When the film begins stating that the title is an earth-shattering acronym (Revolution Education and Development), you wait for something radical and path-breaking. But no ... there is compassion, some mindless violence, a docile retreat, an impulsive retaliation ... and that's about all". A critic from Sify wrote that "Like it or not, in Red didacticism prevails over a clarity of vision, logic and reason. The films leaves you exhausted and stressed and is as avoidable as a migraine". Malini Mannath of Chennai Online said that "But the script is insipid, the scenes are repeated, and it gets all too monotonous towards the end".

References

External links
 

2002 films
2000s Tamil-language films
Indian action films
Films scored by Deva (composer)
Films shot in Madurai
Films about social issues in India
2002 directorial debut films
2002 action films